The following are the telephone codes in Seychelles.

Country Code: +248
International Call Prefix: 00
Trunk Prefix: none

Calling formats
 XXX XXXX - calling within the Seychelles
 +248 XXX XXXX - from outside the Seychelles
The NSN length is seven digits.

List of allocations in Seychelles

New number plan took effect May 2011

Detailed listings

References

Seychelles
Telecommunications in Seychelles
Telephone numbers